TER Normandie is the regional rail network serving the region of Normandy, northwestern France. It is operated by the French national railway company SNCF. It was formed in 2016 from the previous TER networks TER Basse-Normandie and TER Haute-Normandie, after the respective regions were merged.

Network

Five types of services are distinguished by TER Normandie:
Krono+: fast long distance connections
Krono: long and medium distance connections
Citi: frequent suburban services
Proxi: local services
Seasonal services in summer

The rail and bus network as of May 2022:

Rail

Bus

Krono (fast) bus services:
Villedieu-les-Poêles – Mont-Saint-Michel
Caen – Le Mans
Rouen – Pont-Audemer
Rouen – Caen
Granville – Rennes
Caen – Rennes
Rouen – Louviers – Évreux – Verneuil-sur-Avre

Proxi (local) bus services:
Fécamp – Bréauté
Gisors – Serqueux – Dieppe
Briouze – Bagnoles-de-l'Orne
Argentan – Bagnoles-de-l'Orne
Yvetot – Saint-Valery-en-Caux
Alençon – Surdon
Trouville-Deauville – Dives-Cabourg
Argentan – Flers
Lison – Granville

Seasonal services:
Pontorson – Mont-Saint-Michel
Bréauté – Étretat
Bayeux – Colleville-sur-Mer – Arromanches-les-Bains

See also

Réseau Ferré de France
List of SNCF stations in Normandy

References

External links
 Official Site (SNCF)

 
Rail transport in Normandy